This is a worldwide list of people who were killed for being transgender. The list does not include suicides, accidental deaths, or premature deaths. Some of the perpetrators in these cases cite the trans panic defense. Violence against transgender people is also known as trans bashing.

Background
The murder of trans people has served as an impetus to the establishment of the Transgender Day of Remembrance (TDoR).

In 2019, the American Medical Association called the violence against trans people an "epidemic".

In 2020, ABC News "independently confirmed 34 violent deaths of transgender and gender non-conforming people in 2020 at the time of publication." This was published by Good Morning America. According to the Human Rights Campaign, at least 57 transgender and gender non-conforming people were killed in 2021, surpassing the total from 2020 of 44 people.

1980s
1988 – Venus Xtravaganza was strangled to death in New York City on 21 December. Her body was found four days later, shoved under a hotel bed.
1989 – Carla Leigh Salazar was found stabbed to death in her apartment in California. In 2014, Douglas Gutridge was charged with murder on the basis of DNA evidence; he pleaded not guilty, and died in 2016 before the case came to trial.

1990s

1991 – Sonia Rescalvo Zafra, a 45-year-old transgender woman, was killed in the Parc de la Ciutadella by six neo-Nazi skinheads who kicked her and her friend Dori repeatedly in the head while they were lying on the floor. Her death spurred the LGBT community to publicly fight against violence.
1993 – Brandon Teena, a 21-year-old transgender man, was raped and murdered in Falls City, Nebraska on 31 December. Two men were convicted of first-degree murder in the incident, one of whom was sentenced to death. The crime became the subject of the Academy Award-winning film Boys Don't Cry.

2000s
 2000 – Amanda Milan, a 25-year-old trans woman, was walking by Times Square, Manhattan, New York City, when Dwayne McCuller walked up and began to harass and threaten her. Milan stood up to him and asked him if he wanted to fight. Witnesses said he declined. As he walked away, another young man, Eugene Celestine, told McCuller he had a knife. McCuller grabbed it, and stabbed Milan in the neck. A man named David Anderson reportedly helped McCuller escape from the scene. Milan died soon after at St. Vincent's Hospital. Transgender activist Sylvia Rivera worked towards seeing that Milan's death was investigated, and organized Milan's political funeral along with demonstrations claiming a disconnection of transgender rights from the larger LGBT communities. After Milan's murder, Rivera reformed a transgender activist group, Street Trans Activist Revolutionaries (STAR). Rivera cited the crime among the reasons to add a broad definition of gender to the New York City Human Rights Law.
 2002 – Gwen Araujo of Newark, California, a Hispanic teenage trans woman, was killed by four men, two of whom she had had sexual relations with, who beat and strangled her after discovering she was transgender. Two defendants were convicted of second-degree murder, but not convicted on the requested hate crime enhancements. The other two defendants pleaded guilty or no contest to voluntary manslaughter. In at least one of the trials, a trans panic defense – an extension of the gay panic defense – was employed.
 2003 – Nireah Johnson was a 17 year old African American trans girl who was murdered along with her friend Brandie Coleman in Indianapolis, Indiana by Paul Moore. Paul Moore was initially sexually attracted to Johnson, and then discovered that she was transgender. This led him to light her car on fire while she and Coleman were inside.
 2003 – Janice Roberts was an American transgender woman who was kidnapped by serial killer William Devin Howell on 18 June. Howell later told an informant that he tried to engage Roberts in a sexual act, and strangled her when he realized that she was transgender.
 2003 – Shelby Tracy Tom was a Canadian transgender woman working as a sex worker in North Vancouver, British Columbia, Canada, who was killed by Jatin Patel on 27 May 2003. According to Patel, while having sex with her, he noticed her surgery scars, and he panicked as a result and strangled her. The prosecutor attempted to classify her death as a hate crime, but Supreme Court of British Columbia Justice Patrick Dohm ruled that the crime was not motivated by hate, because he did not know of her transgender identity when meeting her, and thus could have not targeted her for it. Patel's defense attorney used a gay panic defense as part of his defense of Patel, who pleaded guilty to a charge of manslaughter, and was sentenced to nine years in jail.
 2006 – Gisberta Salce Júnior, a Brazilian homeless transgender woman, was murdered in Oporto, Portugal, by a group of 14 youths between 12 and 16 years old, who tortured and raped her for three days, and finally threw her, still alive, into a well over 15 meters deep, where she drowned. Eleven of the minors received minimal sentences of under 13 months in a semi-open education center of the Instituto de Reinserção Social, and two received sentences of additional education. Her death became a symbol of violence against women and the LGBT community, and shortly after, laws protecting trans women were introduced in Portugal.
 2007 – Roberto González Onrubia, a transgender man, was killed by two women who had found refuge in his apartment, in Madrid, Spain. Both women had been mistreating Roberto physically and psychologically for a year, before they killed him on 29 August 2007 with a brutal hit on the head. Both women were condemned to 19 years in prison.
 2008 – Angie Zapata was a trans woman who was murdered on 17 July 2008, in Greeley, Colorado. Her death was the first case involving a transgender victim to be ruled a hate crime. Colorado is one of eleven states that protect transgender victims under hate crime laws in the United States. Allen Andrade, who learned eighteen-year-old Angie was transgender after meeting her and spending several days with her, beat her to death with a fire extinguisher. In his arrest affidavit, Andrade called Zapata "it", and during his trial, a tape was played of a phone conversation in which he told his girlfriend "gay things need to die". Andrade's attorneys used a gay panic defense. On 22 April 2009, Andrade was found guilty of first degree murder, hate crimes, and car/ID theft. He was sentenced to life in prison without the possibility of parole.
 2008 – Lateisha "Tiesh" Green was shot and killed on 14 November 2008 outside a house party in Syracuse, New York. Convicted of Onondaga County's first hate-crime homicide, Dwight R. DeLee, was motivated by anti-LGBT bias, and his belief that Green was gay.
 2008 – Simmie Lewis Williams Jr., a 17 year old black gay man, was fatally shot on 22 February 2008 in Fort Lauderdale, Florida. He was wearing women's clothing at the time of his death.

2010s
 2010 – Victoria Carmen White, a black trans woman, was murdered in New Jersey, USA, on 12 September 2010. Alrashim Chambers was brought to trial for her death, but he was acquitted; he blamed another man, Marquise Foster, for the murder. The only motive suggested was transphobic violence; "You a dude?" was heard by White's friends (who were in an adjacent room) shortly before gunshots were fired.
 2011 – Dee Dee Pearson, a black transgender woman, was murdered in Kansas City, Missouri, USA, on 24 December 2011. Kenyon Jones confessed to the murder, telling police that he had paid Pierson for sex, and after he found out she was transgender, he killed her in anger. He was charged with second degree murder and armed criminal action, and was sentenced to 30 years in jail.
 2011 – Svetlana, a trans woman from Moscow, Russia. She was beaten to death with a shovel by two persons, who had intended to have sex with her. It is suggested that after they learned she was transgender, they were motivated to kill her.
 2013 – Carmen Guerrero, a trans woman who was killed by her cellmate, Miguel Crespo, at Kern Valley State Prison in California's Central Valley.
 2013 – Islan Nettles, a 21-year-old black trans woman, was beaten to death in Harlem, New York, on 17 August after a group of at least seven men accosted her and two of her transgender friends. One of the men, James Dixon, had been flirting with her. After he realized she was transgender, he struck her. After falling down, Dixon proceeded to beat her. She died of head injuries in hospital. Her death prompted a number of protests. On 21 April 2016, Dixon was sentenced 12 years in prison after pleading guilty to manslaughter.
 2013 – Dwayne Jones, a Jamaican 16-year-old, was beaten, stabbed, and run over by a car in Montego Bay on 22 July 2013, after attending a party in women's clothing for the first time.
 2014 – Jennifer Laude was murdered in Olongapo, Philippines, on 11 October. Joseph Scott Pemberton was convicted of the murder. Pemberton reportedly killed her after discovering she was a pre-operative transsexual.
 2014 – Çağla Joker was fatally shot in Istanbul on 21 April, while another trans woman survived. The suspects claimed that they initially wanted sexual relations with her and her friend, but shot both when they discovered they were transgender.
 2015 – Mercedes Williamson, aged 17, was stabbed and beaten to death with a claw hammer on 30 May 2015 by her boyfriend Joshua Vallum. Vallum was a member of the Latin Kings gang, which forbids homosexual activity, and was forced to kill Williamson, a pre-operative transgender woman, when other members found out. Vallum was convicted of both state murder charges, for which he received life imprisonment without parole, and federal charges of hate crimes under the Hate Crimes Prevention Act, for which he was sentenced to forty-nine years imprisonment; prosecutors chose not to seek life imprisonment on the federal charges, owing to Vallum's childhood abuse.
 2016 – Alisha, a 23-year-old transgender activist, was shot seven times and died on 25 May in the Lady Reading Hospital in Peshawar, Pakistan. Hospital staff spent over an hour determining whether to place Alisha in a male or female patient ward. Fellow transgender activists reported being taunted as they waited for Alisha outside the emergency room.
 2016 – Paola Ledezma, a 27-year-old trans woman who was rejected by her family and left her birthplace to become a sex worker in Mexico City, was shot on 30 September by client Arturo Felipe Delgadillo Olvera, who became angry after he found out that she was transgender. Delgadillo, an armed security guard, was released after a judge determined that there was insufficient evidence to conclude.
 2016 – Rae'Lynn Thomas, a 28-year-old black trans woman, was shot twice in front of her mother, and then beaten to death by James Allen Byrd in Columbus, Ohio, on 10 August, as she begged for her life. Byrd called her "the devil" and made transphobic comments. Her family called for the murder to be investigated as a hate crime, but Ohio hate crime statutes do not cover gender identity.
 2016 – Jessica Mendes Cavalcanti, 24-year-old trans woman, was surrounded by two young men and fatally stabbed to death in the Canaa neighborhood of Uberlandia on 19 April. One of the suspects who was apprehended by police confessed that they had committed the crime because Cavalcanti was transgender.
 2016 – Laysa Fortuna, a 25-year-old trans woman, was stabbed in the chest, in Aracaju, Sergipe, on 18 October 2018. The aggressor said that if Bolsonaro was elected president, all trans people and transvestites would be killed. Bolsonaro did not comment.
 2017 – Amna, 35 years old, and Meeno, 26 years old, both Khwaja Sara Pakistanis, were allegedly beaten to death and tortured by Saudi police in Riyadh on 28 February. Their clothing and jewelry was also confiscated by the police.
 2017 – Chanda Sharmeeli, a 30-year-old trans woman, was shot dead in Karachi, Pakistan, sometime on 30 August or early morning 31 August. She had been with a gathering of other trans people discussing what they believed to be a recent under-counting of Pakistan's trans community, when a gang of armed men began harassing them, and eventually shot Chanda.
 2017 – Bianca, a 32-year-old trans sex worker from Caracas, Venezuela, was beaten to death by a 29-year-old client "who was shocked by her masculine features". The incident took place in her house in Arnhem, Netherlands on 29 September 2017.
 2017 – Dandara Kettley, a 42-year-old travesti, who was beaten and shot to death in Bom Jardim, a neighborhood in Fortaleza, Ceará.
 2017 – Hilario López Ruiz, a 26-year-old described in a local news report as a travesti, was found dead on 15 August, in a wastewater drainage hole in Ciudad Juárez, Mexico. The news report stated that López was beaten to death by a client who perceived López as a homosexual man.
 2017 – Wilka, a 40-year-old Brazilian trans woman, was attacked and killed on 26 March in Pernambuco, in the southern state of Loteamento Luiz Gonzaga. She suffered three stab wounds. According to a friend she was murdered when someone realized that she was transgender whilst attempting to rob her.
 2018 – Following a false rumor that transgender women were kidnapping children for sex trafficking in Hyderabad, India, four transgender women were attacked by a mob on 26 May 2018. One of the women died. Local police issued an "Appeal to Public" saying that the rumors of criminal involvement by transgender women were "fake", and that the public should not "take law into your hands... so that innocents won't become a victim of those rumors anymore."
 2018 – Nataly Briyth Sánchez, an undocumented sex worker originally from Honduras, was murdered during a sexual encounter on 19 June in Tapachula, Mexico. The client stabbed her to death after discovering that she was transgender.
 2018 – Kelly Stough, 36, a black trans woman, was murdered in Palmer Park, Detroit in December. Albert Weathers, 46, a preacher, has been charged with her murder, and prosecutors claim her gender identity was a motivator.
 2018 – Anastasiya Sapaeva, 43, an actress. Originally from Velikovo, Gorokhovetsky District, Vladimir Oblast, Russia. She was killed in 2018 in Moscow. She became a victim of bullies who did not like her appearance.
 2019 – Nikki Kuhnhausen, a 17 year old trans girl, was murdered by David Y. Bogdanov. Her body was identified from decayed human remains on Saturday, 7 December, in the Larch Mountain area near Vancouver, Washington. Authorities were able to identify the body as Kuhnhausen from personal effects; subsequent examination showed she died from strangulation. Kuhnhausen had previously been missing since 5 June (reported 10 June) when she left with David Y. Bogdanov, a 25-year-old male, who has since been charged with second degree murder. Authorities believe the suspect, looking for a sexual encounter, became enraged upon learning of her transgender status. On 26 February 2020, the Washington State Legislature passed the Nikki Kuhnhausen Act, outlawing the use of panic defenses based on gender and sexual identities. The Act preempts the trial of Kuhnhausen's alleged killer, and thus prevents the use of that defense.
 2019 – Nina Surgutskaya, 25, was killed, dismembered, and partially cooked by her boyfriend Mikhail Tikhonov, a doctor, in Kursk, western Russia. He became angry upon learning that she was assigned male at birth, which was his motivation for the crime. He also flushed some of Nina's body parts down the toilet, and put her limbs and head in a suitcase.
 2019 – Chynal Lindsey, 26, a black trans woman, was murdered by Ruben Alvarado in Dallas, Texas. Alvarado met with Lindsey for a sexual encounter, and killed her upon discovering that she was a trans woman. He was convicted of first degree murder, and sentenced to 37 years in prison.

2020s
 2020 – Özge Bilir, aged 25, was a Dutch trans woman of Turkish descent living in Leidsche Rijn, Utrecht. She was stabbed to death by her ex-boyfriend. She is the first transgender person in the Netherlands to die as a result of violence in 2020 (according to Trans United Europe).
 2020 – Patsy Andrea Delgado, aged 42, was found dead on 5 March in Chihuahua City, Mexico. The police reported that she had been killed by blows to the head; a hammer with traces of blood was found near her body. The Comité de la Diversidad Sexual de Chihuahua, a local LGBT rights association, said that her killing was a hate crime.
 2020 – Alexa Luciano Ruiz was fatally shot in Puerto Rico on 24 February, after an incident in a local restroom. Carmen Yulín Cruz called attention to her death before the 2020 Puerto Rico gubernatorial election. Ms. Luciano was killed while the assailant men laughed.
 2020 – Serena Angelique Velázquez, 32, and Layla Pelaez, 21, both transgender women, were found burned to death on 22 April in Humacao, Puerto Rico.
 2020 – Yampi Mendez Arocho, a 19-year-old trans man, was assaulted five hours before his death, and later shot and killed on 5 March in Moca, Puerto Rico.
 2020 – Penélope Díaz Ramírez, a 31-year-old trans woman, was beaten and hanged to death at the Bayamon correctional complex, a men's prison on 13 April in Bayamón, Puerto Rico.
 2020 – Michelle Michellyn Ramos Vargas, a 33 year old trans woman, was found dead on an isolated road after being shot multiple times on 30 September in San Germán, Puerto Rico. She worked as a bartender and was studying to become a nurse.
 2020 – Selena Reyes-Hernandez, 37, was fatally shot in Chicago, Illinois, on 31 May by a man she went home with, after telling him that she was transgender.
 2020 – Brayla Stone, 17, was murdered in Arkansas in June 2020 by a man seeking to conceal his sexual relationship with her. The killer pleaded guilty and was sentenced to 50 years in prison.
 2020 – Valera (name is changed in the report), a 46-year-old man, a janitor, was killed on 10 February in Chelyabinsk, Russia, by his dorm roommates after they learned he was a transgender man.
 2021 – Ebeng Mayor, a trans man from Batasan Hills, Philippines, was found raped, mutilated, and killed on 20 May 2021, after being missing for three days.
 2022 – Briza Garces Florez, a 40-year-old Colombian trans sex worker from the Netherlands, was stabbed to death by her 32-year-old boyfriend of Greek descent in a hotel in Wassenaar.
 2022 – Doski Azad, a 23-year-old Kurdish transgender woman, was murdered by her brother for being transgender.
 2022 – Ariyanna Mitchell, a 17 year old Black trans girl from Virginia, was shot and killed by 19 year old Jimmy LeShawn Williams with an assault rifle, after he asked her if she was transgender, and she replied, "yes".
 2022 - Cherry Bush, a homeless 48 year old trans woman, was shot to death in Los Angeles. Her alleged killer has been charged with a hate crime.

See also

References

 
Discrimination against transgender people
Violence against LGBT people
Lists of victims of crimes
transgender
Transgender history